Jacob "Jaap" Korevaar (born 25 January 1923) is a Dutch mathematician. He was part of the faculty of the University of California San Diego and University of Wisconsin–Madison, as well as the University of Amsterdam (Korteweg-de Vries Institute for Mathematics).

Korevaar became a member of the Royal Netherlands Academy of Arts and Sciences in 1975. He won the 1987 Lester R. Ford Award, and the 1989 Chauvenet Prize, for an essay on Louis de Branges de Bourcia's proof of the Bieberbach conjecture. In 2012 he became a fellow of the American Mathematical Society.

Korevaar is the older brother of the Olympic water polo player Nijs Korevaar. He turned 100 on 25 January 2023.

References

Prof. dr. J. Korevaar, 1923 -  at the University of Amsterdam Album Academicum website

External links

1923 births
Living people
20th-century Dutch mathematicians
21st-century Dutch mathematicians
Academic staff of the University of Amsterdam
University of California, San Diego faculty
University of Wisconsin–Madison faculty
Fellows of the American Mathematical Society
Members of the Royal Netherlands Academy of Arts and Sciences
People from Reeuwijk
Dutch emigrants to the United States
Dutch centenarians
Men centenarians